Lt. Gen. Douglas Edward Lute (born November 3, 1952) is a retired United States Army lieutenant general and public servant who served as the United States Permanent Representative to NATO from 2013 to 2017.  He was nominated for the post by President Obama on May 23, 2013, confirmed by the Senate on August 1, 2013 by voice vote, and assumed his position on September 3, 2013.

On May 15, 2007, Lute was appointed by George W. Bush to serve as Assistant to the President and Deputy National Security Advisor for Iraq and Afghanistan.  The New York Times referred to him as the "War Czar", since he occupied a senior advisory position responsible for overseeing the wars in Iraq and Afghanistan. He was asked to stay on by new President Barack Obama as Obama's Special Assistant and Senior Coordinator for Afghanistan and Pakistan. After leaving active duty in 2010, Lute remained in his position at the National Security Staff. He is married to Jane Holl Lute, who was the Deputy Secretary of Homeland Security from 2009 to 2013.

Education
Lute was born in Michigan City, Indiana, on November 3, 1952. He graduated from the United States Military Academy at West Point in 1975.  His first assignment was to the 2nd Armored Cavalry Regiment in Bindlach, Germany, where he commanded C Troop. He earned a MPA degree from the Kennedy School of Government of Harvard University in 1983 and taught in the Department of Social Science at West Point.

Second Cavalry
Following attendance at the British Army Staff College, he returned to the 2nd Armored Cavalry Regiment as operations officer, serving both at the squadron and regimental levels. In 1990–91 he deployed and fought with the regiment in Operation Desert Storm, and later served on the staff of the Chief of Staff of the United States Army.

Advancement
Lute commanded 1st Squadron, 7th Cavalry at Fort Hood, Texas, in 1992–94. He then served on the Joint Staff in the J-5 Directorate for Strategic Plans and Policy, and held a War College Fellowship at the Atlantic Council in Washington, D.C.

From 1998 to 2000 he commanded the Second Cavalry Regiment, part of XVIII Airborne Corps, at Fort Polk, Louisiana. In 2001, he was appointed brigadier general. He served next as the executive assistant to the Chairman of the Joint Chiefs of Staff for 14 months before joining the 1st Infantry Division in Schweinfurt, Germany, as the Assistant Division Commander (Support). He commanded Multinational Brigade East in Kosovo for six months in 2002 before being assigned to United States European Command in January 2003 as the Deputy Director of Operations.

In June 2004, Lute began more than two years as Director of Operations (J-3) at United States Central Command (USCENTCOM), during which he oversaw combat operations in Iraq and Afghanistan as well as other operations in the Middle East, Central Asia, and the Horn of Africa. He was appointed to the rank of major general in 2004, and to the rank of lieutenant general in 2006. He assumed the duties of Director of Operations, the Joint Staff, in September 2006.

National Security Council
On June 28, 2007, the Senate confirmed Lute to serve as the Deputy National Security Advisor.  He remained in the position after his retirement from active duty in 2010.

On 10 August 2007, Lute stated that the United States should "consider" reinstating the military draft to relieve the "stressed" volunteer service from multiple tours of duty. This was immediately followed by a comment that it would be a major policy shift and that he did not see a current need for a draft.

Awards and decorations
During his military career he received:
 Defense Superior Service Medal (with 3 Oak Leaf Clusters)
 Legion of Merit (with Oak Leaf Cluster)
 Bronze Star Medal
 Defense Meritorious Service Medal
 Meritorious Service Medal (with 4 Oak Leaf Clusters)
 Joint Service Commendation Medal
 Army Commendation Medal (with 2 Oak Leaf Clusters)
 Army Achievement Medal
 Parachutist Badge
  Ranger Tab
 Office of the Secretary of Defense Identification Badge
 Joint Chiefs of Staff Identification Badge
 Army Staff Identification Badge

Lobbying
In January 2021, Lute joined BGR Group to chair its international and defense practices.

References

External links

Text adapted from public domain Joint Chiefs of Staff biography

Douglas Lute at SourceWatch

Permanent Representatives of the United States to NATO
United States Army generals
United States Military Academy alumni
Harvard Kennedy School alumni
People from Michigan City, Indiana
Living people
Recipients of the Legion of Merit
1952 births
George W. Bush administration personnel
Obama administration personnel